Natangian was Low Prussian dialect of Low German. It is from East Prussia. The name is from the Natangians, a tribe of the Old Prussians.

Geography 
It was spoken around Kornevo, Bartoszyce, Pravdinsk, Srokowo and Kętrzyn. Natangian has or used to have a border with Standard German, Mundart des Kürzungsgebiets, Westkäslausch, Ostsamländisch, Mundart des Ostgebietes, Ostkäslausch and Breslausch. There was a border of Prince-Bishopric of Warmia to the state of the Teutonic Order, which also was the border of Natangian to Ostkäslausch.

Phonology 
In difference to Samländisch, vowel breaking of every long e to ei and every o to ou and the word dirch are  characteristic. It has significant features shared with Mundart der Elbinger Höhe. A is palatal.

References 

East Prussia
Low Prussian dialect
Languages of Poland
Languages of Russia